Faisal Sorour (born 29 September 1996) is a Kuwaiti Paralympic athlete. He won the bronze medal in the men's shot put F63 event at the 2020 Summer Paralympics in Tokyo, Japan.

References

Living people
1996 births
Place of birth missing (living people)
Kuwaiti male shot putters
Paralympic athletes of Kuwait
Athletes (track and field) at the 2020 Summer Paralympics
Medalists at the 2020 Summer Paralympics
Paralympic bronze medalists for Kuwait
Paralympic medalists in athletics (track and field)
21st-century Kuwaiti people